Weston High School is a high school (grades 9–12) in Weston, Massachusetts, United States, a suburb 12 miles west of Boston. The school is located at 444 Wellesley Street in Weston. As of October 2019, it had 663 students. It is accredited by the New England Association of Schools and Colleges. In 2017, Boston Magazine ranked Weston High School #1 in the Weston area, and in 2021 the U.S. News & World Report ranked the school #7 in Boston, MA Metro Area High Schools, #9 in Massachusetts, and #320 in the United States.

Weston High School offers its students a comprehensive and diversified program. Academic courses range from basic to advanced levels. Honors courses are offered in mathematics, world history, foreign languages, and science, while specific Advanced Placement subjects include art, biology, chemistry, calculus, statistics, computer science, English, French, Spanish, Mandarin Chinese, European and U.S. History, and physics. Students must take at least five "minors" each semester and may include courses in the fine and applied arts, business, and home economics. The high school also has a highly successful extra-curricular program that includes athletics, clubs, student government and community service programs.  Most students participate in these after-school activities, with athletics, theater, music, art, and publications being the most popular. Wildcat Tracks is the school newspaper.

Specialists in the Skills Center and Guidance Department provide a broad range of tutoring, personal counseling, and college placement services.  Among the special facilities available to students are a library with more than 15,000 books, videos, ebooks, and audiobooks and extensive on-line databases; four networked computer laboratories; a modern world language laboratory; a recorded books library; choral and instrument rooms; a dance studio; and a physical fitness and weight room.  An indoor swimming pool and a synthetic surface track are among Weston's athletic facilities.

History
Between the end of WWII in 1945 and 1970, the "Boomer" generation, the number of school-age children in Weston increased 363%, from 635 students to 2,937. The town embarked on 25-year school building program resulting in five new school complexes. After a devastating fire in 1948 destroyed the roofing and interior of the new Weston High School, the building was rebuilt as an elementary school and a new replacement high school was commissioned.

This new high school, which was located near Weston Town Center by the current Weston Public Library, Country & Woodland Elementary Schools, was renowned as the "architectural achievement of the century" by the Boston Herald when it opened in January 1950. The nation's first million-dollar public building, Weston High School offered resources and technologies never before seen in a public school. Revolutionary architecture and layout of the school allowed for new teaching and class organization methods. The building has since been torn down due to the building of the new Field School, but it served as the Field School until the 2014–2015 school year.

In 1961, the current Weston High School was built as one of the most expensive schools in the nation at $8,930,001(1961 dollars). This building is the fifth public high school in Weston and is designed to be in active service far longer than many contemporary schools, thanks to constant renovation and a high-quality initial design and build.

The campus

Weston High School is a large brick and glass building, surrounded by trees and sports fields. There are several fields, tennis courts, baseball diamonds, and a large track, shared by the Middle School, which is located on an adjacent campus. There is also a pond situated between the middle school and high school campuses.

Weston High School, designed and built in 1961 at a cost of $64.3 million (2012 dollars), has been renovated periodically since its construction. The facilities have maintained a modern appearance, marked especially by the extensive use of glass.

The design of Weston High School is largely natural-light intensive. Floor-to-ceiling windows mark the facade of three sides of the cafeteria as well as most stairwells. Hallways and classrooms can be lit almost entirely by natural light. The new science wing also features extensive floor-to-ceiling glass.

The building itself consists of a large gymnasium, weight room, library, theater and tech center, dance studio, music rooms, auditorium, computer labs, and many classrooms. The building is split into different wings for each subject, including English and History, Math and Science, and Language. There are currently no plans to reconstruct the existing infrastructure; only to add and renovate.

A seventh wing (G Wing) has been constructed for the 2012–2013 school year. The 23,000 square foot addition serves as the science wing, housing eight science classrooms, a 58-seat lecture hall, an outdoor amphitheater-style classroom, and copious atrium space. The project is designed for and seeking LEED Silver certification.

Outside of the building stands a 40 inch bronze statue of a wildcat. At the cost of $19,000 (2020 dollars) this was the gift to the school from the class of 2020.

On Line Education
In 2016, Weston partnered with MOOC provider edX to offer several free online courses in a variety of subjects. Courses include
On-Ramp to AP* French Language and Culture, On-Ramp to AP* Calculus, and others.

Sports
Weston competes in the DCL, which includes Acton-Boxborough Regional High School, Bedford High School, Concord-Carlisle High School, Lincoln-Sudbury Regional High School, Newton South High School, Waltham High School, Wayland High School, and Westford Academy. Weston's chief rival is Wayland High School.

The Department is headed by Athletic Director Mike McGrath.

Fall sports

Football (B), Soccer (B+G), Cross Country (B+G), Volleyball (G), Golf (B), Field Hockey (G), Rowing (B+G)

In the 2008 season, the Field Hockey team (Weston's only Division I sport) won the Division I State Championship as well as the Dual County League Small Title ending their season with only two loses. In the 2009 season, the Field Hockey team repeated their DCL Small title, but fell to rival Acton-Boxborough in the Division I North Sectional Finals during a penalty stroke on a controversial call in overtime minutes. Many WFH alum continue on to play field hockey in college. Coach Laura Galopin was awarded with Coach of the Year in 2008.

In 2007, 2008, 2010 and 2013 the Golf Team won the Division III State and Sectional Title. Will Caro won the individual Sectional title in 2010 and Jonathan Greb won the individual State title in 2010.

In 2009, Boys Soccer won the Division III State Final for the first time in Weston History. They were also Co-DCL champions that same year.

In 2010, Girls Soccer won the Division III State Final.

The boys and girls crew team represents Weston (and Wayland) every year at the Head of the Charles regatta, the largest 2-day regatta in the world, with multiple entries. Wayland-Weston Crew has won boys, girls, and overall at the fall Massachusetts Public School Rowing State Championships since 2006.

In 2010 the Football team won the Thanksgiving trophy from their rival, the Wayland Warriors, for the first time in 10 years. The team was led in scoring by seniors Nolan Neu and Tom Wells, each scoring 2 Touchdowns. The team finished the season with a 10–1 record, matching a school record set in 1998.

Winter sports

Basketball (B+G), indoor track and field (B+G), wrestling (B), ice hockey (B+G), swimming (B+G), skiing (B+G) and nordic skiing 

The Weston Red Tide (boys' swimming) has won 24 Division 2 State Championships titles over the last 34 years with a current 5 year streak.

Girls' swimming won their first Division 2 State Championships title in 2015.

Boys basketball: State Champion 1998.

Spring sports

Lacrosse (B+G), baseball (B), softball (G), track and field (B+G), tennis (B+G), rowing (B+G)

The crew team, which is a joint team with Wayland, won boys', girls', and overall at the spring Massachusetts Public School Rowing State Championships since 2006.

In 2010, both boys' and girls' tennis captured the Division III North Sectional Championship and went on to win the Division III State Championship.

In the 2010–2011 campaign, the boys' varsity lacrosse team captured the Division III State Championship 5–4 against Dover-Sherborn Reg. High School at Harvard Stadium.

In 2012, 2013 and 2018 the boys' track Team won the Division 4 State Championship.

Weston's boys' tennis team won consecutive state championships in 2017, 2018, 2019, and 2021.

Music and theater

Weston's music program is directed by Christopher Memoli, while Jonathan Eldridge  directs the chorus. Weston also offers an AP Music Theory class, taught by Steven Fulginiti. 31 students were accepted to the MMEA Northeastern Sr. Districts Festival in January 2007, and 13 students were accepted to the MMEA All-State Conference.

The high school chorus, along with the Community Chorus and InCoro Novo, has a performance at Regis College every year where they perform a selection from the vocal repertoire. The large chorus is accompanied by selected high school orchestra members and adult musicians.

Weston's music department also runs the Weston Friends of Music, a parents' group that helps the Weston school music department.

In addition, Weston has a theater program after school.  The Weston High School Theater Company performs three plays a year and competes in the Boston Globe's Massachusetts Educational Theater Guild (METG) festival annually. The company holds several state titles, having won finals at the 2005 and 2008 MHSDG festivals. They advanced to finals in 2006, 2008, 2009, 2010, 2011, and most recently in 2013.

In addition to a full concert choir and chorus, Weston has three student run a cappella groups. In 2010, the boys' group took third place in the International Competition of High School A Cappella in New York City. They were also honored as the number one group in New England, the top all male group, and the top student-run organization in the competition.  Additionally, they received top honors for their choreography as well as an individual award for the best solo performance (Nolan Neu). All three groups perform at monthly all-school assemblies.

Academic teams

Weston High School offers a range of academic teams: math, science, debate, robotics, and NAQT Quizbowl.

Notable alumni
Grover Norquist, class of 1974, political activist and lobbyist, journalist for The American Spectator, president of Americans for Tax Reform
John Garabedian, disc jockey, nationally syndicated host of the Open House Party radio show and a veteran in broadcasting for over 60 years
Alec Sulkin, television writer, writer and producer of Family Guy
David Frank, founding member of the 1980s R&B group The System.

References

External links
Weston High School website

Schools in Middlesex County, Massachusetts
Public high schools in Massachusetts
Weston, Massachusetts